Sir William Calthorpe KB (30 January 1410 – 15 November 1494) was an English knight and Lord of the Manors of Burnham Thorpe and Ludham in Norfolk. He is on record as High Sheriff of Norfolk and Suffolk in 1442, 1458 and 1464 and 1476.

Family 

Sir William Calthorpe was born on 30 January 1410 at Burnham Thorpe, Norfolk, England, son of Sir John Calthorpe and Amy (Amice) Wythe.

Career 

Calthorpe is recorded on 28 June 1443, when he released one of his villeins, from serfdom and set him free from all future services. He became locum tenens and Commissary-General to the late most noble and potent William, Duke of Norfolk, Earl of Pembroke, and Lord Great Chamberlain of England, Ireland and Aquitaine, during the minority of the Duke's son and heir, Henry, Earl of Exeter. In 1469, Sir William described himself as Sir William Calthorp of Ludham, a manor which he owned, as well as that of Burnham Thorpe. In 1479, he was Steward of the household of the Duke of Norfolk.

Calthorpe was made a Knight of the Bath in the Tower of London, by King Edward IV, on the Coronation of his Queen, Elizabeth Woodville, Ascension Day, 26 May 1465.

Calthorpe made Presentations to the Rectory of Beeston, Norfolk in 1460, 1481, 1492, and the Rectory of Hempstede in 1479 and 1485.

In the church of St Martin at Palace, Norwich, is a tablet showing that in 1550 Lady Calthorp (Sir William's daughter-in-law) gave a silver cup and a velvet carpet to that church. It appears that the Calthorpes had their townhouse in this parish for many years, and Sir William Calthorp certainly lived there in 1492, and probably long before then, for it is recorded that in 1447 the Executors of Joan Lady Bardolph, sold the old seat of the Erpinghams, in St.Martin's at the Palace, to William Calthorp, Esq., and the receivership of the Erpingham manor was vested in Sir Philip Calthorp (d. 1535 - grandson of Sir William) and his wife Joan (née Blennerhasset), in 1487.

Marriage and Issue 

Calthorpe's first wife was Elizabeth (1406-1437), daughter of Reginald Grey, 3rd Baron Grey de Ruthyn (1362-1440), by whom Sir William had a son and two daughters.

His second wife was Elizabeth (c. 1441-18 February 1505), eldest daughter and co-heir of Sir Miles Stapleton, of Ingham, Norfolk, by his spouse, Katherine de la Pole (c. 1416-1488),  who settled the manor of Hempstead, Norfolk, upon Elizabeth. Sir William was subsequently found to be lord of three parts of it in 1491; his second surviving son, Sir Francis, died possessed of it in 1544, and his son William next inherited it, and sold it about 1573.  William was the elder brother of Charles Calthorpe, for many years Attorney General for Ireland.

One of Sir William's daughters by his second marriage, Anne (d. bef. March 1558), married Sir Robert Drury, of Thurston, and Hawstead, Suffolk. Another of Sir William's daughters by his second marriage, Elizabeth Calthorpe married Francis Hasilden on 31 May 1494. They had a daughter, Frances Hasilden who married Sir Robert Peyton, of Isleham in January 1516, becoming ancestors of the Peyton baronets. Sir Robert Peyton of Isleham was the son of Sir Robert Peyton, of Wicken by Elizabeth Clere.

Will and Death 

In Sir William's will, he mentions that many of his ancestors were buried in North Creake Church, Norfolk. This Will is given in full in East Anglian Notes & Queries (vol.ii, p. 210), as an interesting specimen of wills of that date. He mentions many of his family. He was buried in the Church of the White Friars, Norwich, beside his first wife.

References
Sources
Banks, Sir T. C., Bt., Baronia Anglica Concentrata; or Baronies in Fee, London, 1844.  Elizabeth Stapleton and her husband, Sir William Calthorpe, with their immediate successors, can be found in the summary pedigree of the Stapleton family on p. 267.
Visitation of Yorkshire, 1563/4 by William Flower, Norroy King of Arms, published London, 1881, p. 295 (outline pedigree of the Stapleton family)..
Burke, John, and John Bernard, The Royal Families of England, Scotland, and Wales, with their descendants, Sovereigns and Subjects, London, 1851, vol. 2, pedigree CXVII.
Burke,  Sir Bernard, Ulster King of Arms, Dormant, Abeyant, Forfeited, and Extinct Peerages of the British Empire, London, 1883, p. 504, where Sir William is erroneously named as Sir Philip.
Shaw, William A., Litt.D., The Knights of England, London, 1906.
Carr-Calthorpe, Colonel Christopher William, C.B.E., R.I., Notes on the Families of Calthorpe and Calthrop, etc., 3rd edition, London, 1933, p. 38-9; 41-6.
Weis, Frederick Lewis, et al., (editor), The Magna Charta Sureties, 1215, 5th edition, Baltimore, 2002, p. 7. 
Richardson, Douglas, Plantagenet Ancestry, Baltimore, Maryland, 2004, p. 580 and 621.
Citations

1410 births
1494 deaths
People from Ludham
Knights of the Bath
High Sheriffs of Norfolk
High Sheriffs of Suffolk
15th-century English people
People of the Tudor period